Slamet Rahardjo Djarot or better known as Slamet Rahardjo (born 21 January 1949) is an Indonesian actor, director, and screenwriter of Javanese descent. He is the elder brother of director, songwriter, and politician, Eros Djarot. Since his directorial debut in 1979 with Rembulan dan Matahari, he has directed and/or written twelve films; one of which, Langitku, Rumahku, was Indonesia's submission to the 63rd Academy Awards in 1991.

Biography
Rahardjo was born in Serang, West Java (now Banten), on 21 January 1949. He was the first of seven children born to Djarot Djojoprawiro, an air force officer, and Ennie Tanudiredja, a housewife interested in woodcarving. Rahardjo spent most of his childhood in Yogyakarta, where he dreamed of becoming a visual artist. However, after finishing high school at State Senior High School 2, he attended the National Indonesian Theatre Academy (or ATNI). During his studies at ATNI, he befriended Teguh Karya. Together, the two founded the theatre group Teater Populer in 1968.

Three years later, Teater Populer, working together with Sarinade Film, produced Wadjah Seorang Laki-Laki (The Face of a Boy). Rahardjo was immediately cast in the lead role, while Karya directed the film; singer Laila Sari was cast as his love interest. Two years later, Rahardjo starred in 1973's Cinta Pertama (First Love) alongside Christine Hakim; the two would later star as romantic leads in several other films, and in 2010 were selected as the second best Indonesian cinema couple by Tabloid Bintang. After the success of Cinta Pertama, Rahardjo went on to play in 1975's Ranjang Pengantin (Wedding Bed), 1976's Perkawinan Dalam Semusim (A Season's Marriage) and 1977's Badai Pasti Berlalu (The Storm Will Surely Pass). During this period, Rahardjo would only work for Karya; he reportedly left a dinner meeting immediately after another director asked him to act in a film, later telling Tempo that it was as if the director was borrowing a tape recorder, not considering how Rahardjo would feel.

In 1979, Rahardjo made his directorial debut with Rembulan dan Matahari (The Moon and the Sun). That same year, he played in November 1828; he also served as one of the film's production designers. Two years later he directed Seputih Hatinya, Semerah Bibirnya (As White as the Heart, as Red as the Lips). In 1982, he starred alongside Hakim in Di Balik Kelambu (Behind the Mosquito Net); the two played newlyweds living at the bride's parents home. This was followed by several other directorial efforts, including Ponirah Terpidana (Ponirah is Convicted; 1984), Kembang Kertas (Paper Flowers; 1984), Kodrat (1985), and Kasmaran (Falling in Love; 1987).

In 1988 Rahardjo played National Hero of Indonesia Teuku Umar, an Acehnese revolutionary hero, in Tjoet Nja' Dhien; the film was directed by his younger brother Eros Djarot. The following year, Rahardjo directed Langitku, Rumahku (My Sky, My Home). The film, nominated for 9 Citra Awards at the 1990 Indonesian Film Festival, went on to win the Three Continents Festival that same year.

After Karya's death in 2001, Rahardjo took over as leader of Teater Populer. The following year, he released Marsinah, a biopic of the workers' rights activist of the same name who was killed in 1993.

In 2007, Rahardjo took the role of Siska's father in Teddy Soeriaatmadja's remake of Badai Pasti Berlalu; he was the only cast member of the original film to act in the remake. In 2010 he played in Alangkah Lucunya (Negeri Ini) (How Funny (This Country Is)) as the father of a street child; that same year he played the primary antagonist in Hanung Bramantyo's biopic of Muhammadiyah founder Ahmad Dahlan. In 2011 he played Ki Kartareja in Ifa Isfansyah's Sang Penari (The Dancer), an adaptation of Ahmad Tohari's trilogy Ronggeng Dukuh Paruk.

Partial filmography

Acting credits

Awards and recognition
Rahardjo has received two Citra Awards at the Indonesian Film Festival for his acting, the first in 1975 for Ranjang Pengantin and the second for Di Balik Kelambu. Although he has yet to receive a Citra Award for screenwriting, six of his films have been nominated: Rembulan dan Matahari, Di Balik Kelambu, Ponirah Terpidana, Kodrat, Kasmaran and Langitku, Rumahku. Langitku, Rumahku represented Indonesia at the 63rd Academy Awards in 1991 for the Academy Award for Best Foreign Language Film, but was not nominated; this came the year after Eros's film Tjoet Nja' Dhien was submitted to the Academy. In 1996 Rahardjo received the Usmar Ismail Prize from the National Film Consideration Body.

Directing and writing credits
 Rembulan dan Matahari (The Moon and the Sun; 1979)
 Seputih Hatinya Semerah Kertas (As White as the Heart, as Red as the Lips; 1981)
 Ponirah Terpidana (Ponirah is Convicted; 1984)
 Kembang Kertas (Paper Flowers; 1985)
 Kodrat (1986)
 Kasmaran (Falling in Love; 1987)
 Langitku, Rumahku (My Sky, My Home; 1990)
 Fatamorgana (1992)
 Anak Hilang (Missing Child; 1993)
 Telegram (2000)
 Marsinah (2002)
 Batas (Limit''; 2011)

Awards and nominations

References
Footnotes

Bibliography

External links

Living people
1949 births
Citra Award winners
Male actors from Banten
Indonesian male actors
Indonesian film directors
People from Serang